Faustin Munene (born 21 March 1951, Idiofa, Belgian Congo) is a Congolese military officer and politician known for his opposition to Mobutu Sese Seko, leader of Zaïre, and later President Joseph Kabila of the Democratic Republic of the Congo. He held a number of senior military posts under Laurent-Désiré Kabila after the fall of Mobutu, including commander of the Force Aérienne Congolaise, the DRC air force, and Deputy Minister of the Interior. Since 2010, he has been living in exile in the neighboring Republic of the Congo, having fled there since being accused by the DRC authorities of plotting a coup.

Biography
Born in the town of Idiofa, in what became the Bandundu Province, of Belgian Congo, Munene took part in the early rebellions in the 1960s under Pierre Mulele against the central government in Kinshasa. Munene later escaped to Angola, where he joined the Angolan Army and married a local woman by the name of Catarina Manuel Jorge. He later became a member of the AFDL under Laurent-Désiré Kabila. Reaching the rank of general, he served as the Chief of Staff of the Air Force of the Democratic Republic of the Congo and later Deputy Minister of the Interior and Public Safety from 1997 to 1998. He retired from the Armed Forces in 2006.

His residence was attacked by unidentified men in October 2009. In September 2010, Munene was sentenced to life imprisonment by a military court in the DRC for attempting to overthrow the government of President Joseph Kabila and start a rebellion in Bas-Congo. He then disappeared and was found to have fled to Brazzaville, capital of the neighboring Republic of the Congo. His presence there became a source of tension between Congo-Brazzaville and Congo-Kinshasa, but the former refused to extradite the general to the DRC. Since fleeing to exile in the neighboring Congo, Munene has been accused of being the leader of the rebel group Army of Popular Resistance, which opposes the DRC central government under Kabila.

References

1951 births
Angolan military personnel
Democratic Republic of the Congo exiles
Democratic Republic of the Congo expatriates in Angola
Democratic Republic of the Congo expatriates in the Republic of the Congo
Democratic Republic of the Congo military personnel
Democratic Republic of the Congo politicians convicted of crimes
Government ministers of the Democratic Republic of the Congo
People from Kwilu Province
Living people
21st-century Democratic Republic of the Congo people